"Don't Phunk with My Heart" (censored as "Don't Mess with My Heart") is a song recorded by American group the Black Eyed Peas for their fourth studio album Monkey Business (2005). It was written by band members will.i.am and Fergie with Printz Board, George Pajon, Jr. and Full Force; will.i.am also produced and engineered the song. The song is a hip hop song in which the lyrics, according to will.i.am, tell of a situation between a couple when one tries to end the relationship and the other is in disbelief. It features compositional samples of songs derived from two Bollywood films of the 1970s, Apradh (1972) and Don (1978), as well as interpolations of Lisa Lisa and Cult Jam's 1985 single "I Wonder If I Take You Home" and Gucci Crew II's 1988 single "Sally (That Girl)", which effectively credited Kalyanji–Anandji, Indeewar and Full Force as songwriters. The song was released as the lead single from Monkey Business on April 5, 2005, by A&M Records and Interscope Records.

"Don't Phunk with My Heart" was received positively by most contemporary music critics, with many of them naming it one of the album's highlights. It was also met with a positive commercial response, peaking at number three on the US Billboard Hot 100–becoming the group's highest-peaking single on the chart at the time–and at number one in Australia, the Czech Republic, Finland, and New Zealand. At the 48th Annual Grammy Awards (2006), it won Best Rap Performance by a Duo or Group, while receiving a nomination for Best Rap Song. The song's accompanying music video is a parody of game shows, most notably The Price Is Right, The Dating Game,  and Love Connection.

Background
"Don't Phunk with My Heart" is one of two songs on Monkey Business that was written by will.i.am and Fergie of the Black Eyed Peas. Additional writers include George Pajon, Jr. and Printz Board.

The song contains samples of several songs: "I Wonder If I Take You Home", written and composed by Full Force, and "Ae Naujawan Sab Kuchh Yahan" and "Yeh Mera Dil Pyaar Ka Diwana", both recorded by Asha Bhosle, composed by Kalyanji Anandji, and with lyrics written by Indeewar. The former of the latter two was featured in the Hindi film Apradh (1972) while the latter was featured in the Hindi film Don (1978).

Black Eyed Peas member will.i.am, in addition to co-writing the song, produced the track on his own while working with Neil Tucker and Tal Herzberg on engineering it. Co-writer Pajon, Jr. contributed guitars while Keith Harris played the drums. "Don't Phunk with My Heart" features a prominent use of several string instruments, which include the electric violin and Mellotron strings, played by Charlie Baccarat and song co-writer Board. It was then mixed by Mark "Spike" Stent and programmed by Herzberg using Pro Tools technology. The song was recorded at Metropolis Studios in Chiswick, London, England and The Record Plant in Los Angeles, California. "Don't Phunk with My Heart" serves as the first single taken from Monkey Business (2005). Interscope Records solicited the song to mainstream radios on April 11, 2005, in the United States.

Composition
"Don't Phunk with My Heart" is a hip-hop dance song that runs for 4 minutes and 4 seconds. According to the digital music sheet published at Musicnotes.com by Universal Music Publishing Group, it is written in a key of F minor. The song is set in common time and runs through a freely moving tempo of 132 beats per minute. will.i.am described the song to be the lyrical sequel to the band's 2003 single "Shut Up" (Elephunk, 2003). He explained: "When you're on bad terms with a significant other, you don't want to break up. You tell her things and at the time you really mean them. But she's saying, stop f****ing  with me."  Jason King of The Village Voice called the song a "sassy gender duel" between will.i.am and Fergie, while commenting that it is reminiscent of "Shut Up".

Critical reception
Nicholas Taylor of PopMatters called "Don't Phunk with My Heart" a "standout" in regard to "complex and engaging hip-hop music, a mix of rap, soul, jazz, and funk that will constantly surprise and delight." However, he stated that "Pump It" would have been a better choice for the first single, writing that it "continually impresses and grooves and better melds raps with beats", while noting "Don't Phunk with My Heart" to get repetitive and clunky. Taylor further explains the song's cons, writing that it suffers from "unimpressive rapping" and "a distinct lack of substance". John Bush of Allmusic listed it as one of the album's best tracks. Nathan Rabin of The A.V. Club calls it a continuation of the "summertime vibe of dumb fun". Robert Christgau listed the song as a track pick. Azeem Ahmad of musicOMH predicted the album Monkey Business to be a success if "Don't Phunk with My Heart" was an indication of its sound. The staff at Boston.com felt the song was "OK" compared to "My Style", a different album track. Kelefa Sanneh of The New York Times called it "a much more wholesome hip-hop hit", comparing it to Ying Yang Twins' 2005 single "Wait (The Whisper Song)".

The Black Eyed Peas were nominated for two 2006 Grammy Awards for the song and won for "Grammy Award for Best Rap Performance by a Duo or Group". The song also won the BMI Award, which was awarded to the Kalyanji Anandji brothers, for their compositions of "Ye Mera Dil" and "Ae Nujawan" used as a basis for the song. The award was collected by Anandji Virji Shah, the surviving member of the duo.

Chart performance
In the United States, "Don't Phunk with My Heart" entered the Billboard Hot 100 at number ninety-seven following its release. The song then jumped sixty-six places to number thirty-one in the following week due to digital sales. It continued to rise up the chart until June 25, 2005, when it peaked at number three due to an increase in digital sales, becoming the week's "greatest digital gainer". "Don't Phunk with My Heart" also reached the top ten on the Billboard Mainstream Top 40. The song sold over 500,000 digital copies in the United States, earning a gold certification by the Recording Industry Association of America (RIAA).

In the United Kingdom, "Don't Phunk with My Heart" entered and debuted at number three on the UK Singles Chart on May 22, 2005 (for the week ending May 28, 2005). It lasted four weeks inside the top ten and sixteen weeks total on the chart. According to the Official Charts Company, the song sold 210,000 copies there. The song fared similarly in Ireland, where it debuted and peaked at number four on the singles chart. On May 23, 2005, "Don't Phunk with My Heart" debuted and peaked at number one on the Australian Singles Chart. It lost the position the following week but retook the position on June 12 and maintained the top spot for two more weeks. The song has shipped over 70,000 copies in Australia, earning a platinum certification by the Australian Recording Industry Association (ARIA). In New Zealand, the song entered the singles chart at number thirty-six on May 16, 2005. The following week, it rose to number one, where it stayed for three consecutive weeks. The song shipped 15,000 copies in New Zealand, earning a platinum certification by the Recording Industry Association of New Zealand (RIANZ).

"Don't Phunk with My Heart" appeared on the Norwegian Singles Chart on May 24, 2005, at number five. It maintained that position for three weeks before rising to number four on June 14, 2005, where it continued to stay for three more weeks. The song remained on the chart for six more weeks and shipped over 5,000 copies, earning a gold certification by IFPI Norway. Across the rest of Europe, "Don't Phunk with My Heart" achieved top-five positions in Austria, Denmark, Finland, Flanders, Italy, the Netherlands, Spain, and Switzerland and reached the top ten in France, Germany, Sweden, and Wallonia.

Music video
The video for the song is a parody of game shows, most notably The Price Is Right, The Dating Game,  and Love Connection. will.i.am, apl.de.ap and Taboo attempt to win the heart of Fergie, a beautiful girl, by being chosen to go on a date with her by spinning a wheel to decide where they will go, then being teleported to the site. will.i.am takes Fergie on a horse-ride, apl takes her dancing and Taboo takes her to a restaurant, but each date ends badly with Voodoo Thursday sabotaging the boys' attempts. He makes will.i.am's horse buck him off, he makes apl twitch when Fergie tries to kiss him, and he programs Taboo to grab another girl's butt. In the end, Fergie has to choose whom to end up with. Voodoo then spins the wheel, it comes up "knock boots". When the time comes for Fergie to choose, Voodoo whispers something to Fergie, and they are teleported away. The members of The Black Eyed Peas all appear in the video, some in multiple roles. will.i.am plays himself, the host Voodoo Thursday, and the drummer in the live band. apl plays himself, the guitarist, and the announcer, Fergie plays herself and Taboo plays himself and the pianist/keyboardist in the live band.

A brief instrumental clip of the song can be heard on various episodes of The Hills as their cue for possible drama coming up.

Track listings
US promotional CD (AMRR-11406-2 1N02)

UK CD single (9882330)

European CD single (988 232-9)

European enhanced maxi-single (988 232-8)

Credits and personnel
Credits are adapted from the liner notes of Monkey Business, A&M Records, will.i.am Music Group, Interscope Records.

Recording and sample
 Recorded at Metropolis Studios in Chiswick, London, England and The Record Plant in Los Angeles, California.
 Contains elements of "I Wonder If I Take You Home", written by Full Force under Careers-BMG Music (BMI)
 Contains elements of "Ae Naujawan Sab Kuchh Yahan", written by Kalyanji Anandji and Indeewar under Saregma India Ltd. (IRPS)
 Contains elements of "Yeh Mera Dil Yaar Ka Diwana", written by Kalyanji Anandji and Indeewar under Saregma India Ltd. (IRPS)

Personnel
 Songwriting – William Adams, Stacy Ferguson, Printz Board, George Pajon, Jr., Full Force, Kalyanji Anandji, Indeewar
 Vocals – will.i.am, Fergie and Taboo
 Production – will.i.am
 Drums – Keith Harris
 Guitar – George Pajon, Jr.
 Keyboards – Printz Board
 String arrangement – Ron Fair
 Electric violin – Charlie Baccarat
 Pro Tools programming – Tal Herzberg
 Engineering – will.i.am, Neil Tucker, Tal Herzberg
 Mixing – Mark "Spike" Stent

Charts

Weekly charts

Year-end charts

Certifications

Release history

Cover versions
Russian metalcore band Amatory released a cover version of the song, as "Don't Fuck with My Heart". It appears on their covers EP Discovery.

References

External links
 "Don't Phunk with My Heart" lyrics

2005 singles
2005 songs
A&M Records singles
Black Eyed Peas songs
Interscope Records singles
Music videos directed by The Malloys
Number-one singles in Australia
Number-one singles in the Czech Republic
Number-one singles in Finland
Number-one singles in New Zealand
Songs written by Fergie (singer)
Songs written by George Pajon
Songs written by will.i.am